Vedalen is a small valley in eastern Norway. It is located in the municipality of Hol in Viken county. It is situated  7 km outside the town of Geilo. There are approximately 25 cottages in the valley. Vedalen is a pastoral valley situated by the river Vedalsvatnet. The valley  contains a number of small lakes which are suitable for fishing.

References

Valleys of Viken